Clifton School may refer to

Clifton School (South Africa)
Clifton Preparatory School, Nottingham Road, South Africa
Clifton School (Baltimore, Maryland)
Clifton College, England
Clifton Community School, Rotherham, England
Clifton High School (disambiguation)